KCQX-LP (106.9 FM) was a low-power FM radio station licensed to Cuchara, Colorado, United States. The station was owned by Cuchara Community Broadcast Association. The station surrendered its broadcast license to the Federal Communications Commission on December 2, 2012.

References

External links
 

CQX-LP
CQX-LP
Radio stations established in 2005
Radio stations disestablished in 2012
Defunct radio stations in the United States
2005 establishments in Colorado
2012 disestablishments in Colorado
CQX-LP